The Ministry of Welfare and Social Security (Vâzart-e Refah-e vâ Tamin-e Ajtema'i) established in 2004 and dissolved in 2011, was an Iranian government body responsible for the oversight of Social security in Iran.

See also
Social security in Iran
Health care in Iran
Subsidy reform plan
Iranian labor law
Social Security Organization (Iran)
Civil Servants Pension Organization
Iran's religious foundations
Iran Technical and Vocational Training Organization
Government of Iran
Ministry of Labour and Social Affairs (Iran)

External links
 Webpage of the Ministry of Welfare and Social Security
 US Social Security Administration: Iran's entry
World Bank Statistics Human development, social and economic indicators for Iran
Iran's Ministry of Welfare and Social Security policies still based on charity
Iran Para-governmental Organizations (bonyads)  By Ali A. Saeidi  (Source: The Middle East Institute)
Poverty and Inequality since the Revolution By Djavad Salehi-Isfahani (Source: The Middle East Institute)

Iran
Iran, Welfare and Social Security
2011 disestablishments in Iran
Welfare and Social Security
Ministry of Cooperatives Labour and Social Welfare (Iran)